Vincenzo Tondo (born 10 March 1937) is an Italian sports shooter. He competed at the 1976 Summer Olympics, the 1984 Summer Olympics and the 1988 Summer Olympics.

References

External links
 

1937 births
Living people
Italian male sport shooters
Olympic shooters of Italy
Shooters at the 1976 Summer Olympics
Shooters at the 1984 Summer Olympics
Shooters at the 1988 Summer Olympics
Sportspeople from the Metropolitan City of Bari
20th-century Italian people